Latham Tawhai (born 23 August 1972) is a rugby league coach and former player from New Zealand. He has also represented his country in softball.

Playing career
A Northcote Tigers junior, Tawhai played in the Auckland Rugby League competition before being selected for Auckland, and making the North Harbour Lion Red Cup side.

After playing for the champion North Harbour Sea Eagles in the Lion Red Cup, Tawhai represented New Zealand at the inaugural Super League World Nines, helping the side to victory before signing for Keighley in 1996. He later went on to play for Hunslet (winning the Tom Bergin Trophy for Man of the Match in the 1999 Grand Final), Rochdale Hornets, Doncaster and Hull Kingston Rovers.

Tawhai then left Hull KR to take up a player-coach role at Hunslet in 2004.

Coaching career
Tawhai was part of the RFL's coaching pathway starting with the Leeds Service Area and Rhinos Scholarship Programme.  He went on to assist with the Bradford Bulls Foundation before coaching on the RFL's Elite Player Camps.

In 2005 after guiding local amateur club Drighlington to success in the Pennine Premier League, the Yorkshire Cup Final and winning the Pennine League Coach of the Year, he moved to London where he became the first full-time coach at the London Skolars. In October 2007, after London Skolars best ever season, Latham was named the Co-operative National League Two Coach of the year. He left Skolars at the end of 2007 to become assistant coach at Harlequins RL under Brian McDermott.
He remained with the renamed London Broncos until mid-season 2012 when he left the club, moving to Wales for personal and business reasons.

Other sports
Tawhai was a New Zealand Fastpitch softball representative. He went on to play in the United States with the Larry Miller Club in Salt Lake City and make the USA National U23 Tournament Team.

After being resident in the UK for a number of years, he represented Great Britain at the 2004 World Softball Championships.

Tawhai was also an Auckland Rugby Union Junior representative.

References

External links
 Harlequins profile
 Tawhai Ready to Get Stuck In at Quins

1972 births
Living people
Auckland rugby league team players
Doncaster R.L.F.C. players
Hull Kingston Rovers players
Hunslet R.L.F.C. players
Keighley Cougars players
London Skolars coaches
New Zealand expatriate sportspeople in England
New Zealand Māori rugby league players
New Zealand Māori rugby league team players
New Zealand rugby league coaches
New Zealand rugby league players
New Zealand softball players
North Harbour rugby league team players
Northcote Tigers players
Rochdale Hornets players
Rugby league halfbacks
Rugby league five-eighths